Amblyseius neofirmus is a species of mite in the family Phytoseiidae.

References

neofirmus
Articles created by Qbugbot
Animals described in 1994